William Shaw Fairhurst (1 October 1902 – 27 February 1979) was an English professional footballer who played as a left back. He played over 150 matches in the Football League. His brother, David, played for England and Newcastle United.

Playing Career

One of ten children of a former Blyth Spartans footballer (also William Shaw Fairhurst), William Shaw "Billy" Fairhurst was a sturdy left-back. He played in the North Eastern League during his three seasons with Middlesbrough, before moving to Southport FC and making his full league debut in 1928.

In 1929, he moved from Southport to play for Nelson FC. When Nelson dropped out of the League, he stayed on for a season in the Lancashire Combination whilst working as a local dairyman. Nelson's manager, English, who signed him for Nelson, also signed him for Northampton Town. His football career ended after a spell with Hartlepools United owing to an ulcerated leg.

Life after football

Billy served in the Durham Light Infantry during the war and was one of the first (liberators) into Bergen-Belsen Concentration Camp.

After the war he settled with his wife, Mary (nee Windross), in Middlesbrough. They had two children; Dorothy Mary and Eric William. Billy worked for many years at ICI (Billingham). He died of a heart attack, aged 76.

References
 
 
Wilde, Geoff; Braham, Michael (1995). The Sandgrounders: The Complete League History of Southport F.C. p. 451. ISBN 1-874181-14-4.

1902 births
1979 deaths
People from Blyth, Northumberland
Footballers from Northumberland
English footballers
Association football defenders
Blyth Spartans A.F.C. players
Middlesbrough F.C. players
Southport F.C. players
Nelson F.C. players
Northampton Town F.C. players
Hartlepool United F.C. players
Tranmere Rovers F.C. players
English Football League players